Wondrous Bughouse is the second album by Youth Lagoon, the stage name of American musician Trevor Powers. It peaked at No. 76 on the Billboard 200, No. 12 on the Independent Albums chart and No. 26 on the Top Rock Albums chart.

Composition
Wondrous Bughouse, Trevor Powers' sophomore record as Youth Lagoon, finds Powers collaborating alongside distinguished mixer/producer Ben H. Allen for the first time. Allen had produced with indie musicians before, previously lending his expertise to lauded records such as experimental pop quartet Animal Collective's influential Merriweather Post Pavilion (2009) and art rock quintet Deerhunter's Halcyon Digest (2010).

Powers' debut for the Fat Possum record label, The Year of Hibernation, was produced by engineer/friend Jeremy Park in Park's own Boise-based home studio Kung Pow! Studio. The final product would don a bedroom pop aesthetic that would "stand out from its lo-fi peers thanks to a sense of wide-eyed adventure."

With Bughouse, Powers' sonic palette would expand to yield "a dense tapestry of swirling overdubs and warped psychedelia," "much grander and more ambitious than its predecessor."

The "brilliantly grandiose" "Mute" is "a strongly psychedelic, deranged rainbow puke of a song," on which Powers' vocals "have never sounded so soaring and confident."

Third track "Attic Doctor" features a "calliope-like melody", recalling "the darker VHS carnvial sound of Ariel Pink."

Critical reception

Wondrous Bughouse received positive reviews from most contemporary music critics. At Metacritic, which assigns a normalized rating out of 100 to reviews from mainstream critics, the album received an average score of 74, based on 24 reviews, which indicates "generally favorable reviews".

Accolades

Tracks

Track listing

Charts

References

Youth Lagoon albums
2013 albums
Fat Possum Records albums
Albums produced by Ben H. Allen